Ibanda is a town in the Western Region of Uganda. It is the main political, administrative, and commercial centre of Ibanda District and the site of the district headquarters. It started wayback in 1990s and was elevated from a trading centre to a town board, town council and in 2016 it was granted a Municipality status. The Municipal Council has three Divisions of Kagongo, Bisheshe and Bufunda with 21 wards of Kyaruhanga, Bufunda, Nyamirima, Nsasi, Kayenje, Kashangura, Rwenshuri, Kigarama, Rugazi, Rwobuzizi, Kakatsi, Bugarama, Karangara, Kabaare, Kanyansheko, Nyakatookye, Kyeikucu, Kikoni, Kagongo, Ruyonza and Katongore ward. Ibanda Municipal Council has over 230 villages.
Ibanda Municipal council commenced its operations on 1 July 2016 after being elevated from a Town Council and other sub counties that were annexed to. (Bisheshe Sub County, Nsasi, Part of Nyabuhikye Sub County and Kashangura).

Location
The coordinates of the town are 0°08'05.0"S, 30°29'42.0"E (Latitude:-0.134712; Longitude:30.495000).

Ibanda Municipal Council is located in Ibanda South Constituency of Ibanda District, south western part of Uganda. It borders with Igorora Town Council, Kikyenkye, Kijongo and Ishongororo sub-counties of Ibanda District, Kinoni s/c in Kiruhura District and Kicheche Sub-County of Kamwenge district and it hosts the Ibanda District headquarters.
The former town council started back in 1994 with two wards of Bufunda and Kagongo and during the physical development plan process in 2010, three more wards were created i.e.

History
Ibanda is known for the killing of Harry George Galt, a British sub-commissioner for the western province of the Uganda Protectorate, on 19 May 1905.
Its name came from a native word Ibandwa where the local people used to climb the hill to settle their misfortunes with their gods hence translated as ibandwa hill.

Population
The 2002 national census estimated the population of Ibanda at 22,730. In 2010, the Uganda Bureau of Statistics (UBOS) estimated the population at 27,800. In 2011, UBOS estimated the mid-year population at 28,500. In 2014, the national population census put the population at 31,316.

Points of interest
The following additional points of interest lie in Ibanda town or close to its borders:
 offices of Ibanda Town Council
 the headquarters of Ibanda District Administration
 Ibanda University, a private co-educational institution of higher learning, established in 2014.
 Uganda Martyrs' Hospital Ibanda,  a community hospital administered by the Roman Catholic Archdiocese of Mbarara

Photos
Another View of Ibanda Town

See also
 Patrick Bitature
 List of cities and towns in Uganda

References

External links
Google Map of Ibanda Town

 
Ibanda District
Ankole sub-region
Populated places in Western Region, Uganda